The Coupe de France was a French rugby union competition which was founded early in the 20th century but was abandoned during World War II, and then restarted in 1943. All clubs were invited to participate, about 100 of them took part, with the first division teams joining in during the last rounds.

The 1951 final was so violent that the Rugby Football Union asked for it to be discontinued, otherwise France could have been expelled from the Five Nations Tournament which they had just rejoined in 1939. And this was exactly what the chairman of the French Federation did. It was replaced the next year by the Challenge Yves du Manoir which had been ended by the war.

The competition was reborn in the mid-1980s under the impulse of the then president of the French Federation, Albert Ferrasse, in parallel with both the championship and the Challenge Yves du Manoir. But low gates, an already crammed schedule doomed it after three seasons.

A final effort to resurrect it was made in 1996, when it was merged with the Challenge Yves du Manoir, which was called Trophée Du-Manoir Coupe de France. It lasted until 2003 under three different names. As a result, the final seven competitions are counted both in the Coupe de France and Challenge Du Manoir records.

Finals

References
 

Rugby union competitions in France

eu:Yves du Manoir errugbi txapelketa